"Don't Bring Lulu" is a 1925 Dixieland jazz song.

Background
Don't Bring Lulu was first published by Jerome H. Remick, based in Detroit and New York City, United States, in 1925. It is the 63rd most covered song from 1925. "Lulu" in the song is a 1920s flapper. The song lyrics include a reference to the traditional nursery rhyme and singing game for parties, "London Bridge Is Falling Down".

The sheet music is credited to Billy Rose, Lew Brown, and Ray Henderson. It was originally a novelty song and was often recorded by male singers in a comic style, including Billy Jones and Ernest Hare for example, with additional dialogue. A praised recording was the 1960 single by Dorothy Provine, backed by Whisper Song. She also performed the song for the American television series The Roaring 20's, which was aired during 1960–1962.

Recordings
The following performed and recorded the song in the year it was first published (1925):

 Ernest Hare and Billy Jones
 Billy Murray (1925)
 Van and Schenck
 Nathan Glantz and His Orchestra (vocals: Chick Straun)
 Hall and Ryan
 The Little Ramblers (vocals: Billy Jones)
 Jan Garber and His Orchestra (instrumental)
 Benny Krueger's Orchestra (vocals: Billy Jones)
 Sam Lanin and His Orchestra (vocals: Ernest Hare)
 The Gilt-Edged Four (instrumental)
 Jeffries and His Rialto Orchestra (vocals: John Thorne)

The following performed and recorded the song in later years:

 Frank Sinatra and Jack Carson (radio transcript) (1946)
 Tiny Hill and His Orchestra (vocals: Tiny Hill) (1953)
 The Andrews Sisters (with Billy May's Orchestra) 1958)
 Bobby Short (1959)
 "Big" Tiny Little (instrumental) (1959)
 Dorothy Provine (featured in the television series The Roaring 20's) (1960)
 Max Bygraves with Ted Heath and His Music (1960)
 Kay Barry (1961)
 Clinton Ford (1961)
 Victor Silvester and His Ballroom Orchestra (instrumental) (1961)
 Mitch Miller and The Gang (1962)
 Gery Scott (1962)
 Mrs Mills (instrumental) (1962)
 The Buffalo Bills (1965)
 The Billy Vaughn Singers (1969)
 The Oxcentrics (1976)
 Bobbysocks! (1985)
 Adam Swanson (piano, vocals: Frederik Hodges, additional modern lyrics) (2009)
 The Oxcentrics (2020, in lockdown)

Other recordings include:

 Ted Black and His Orchestra
 Stan Boreson and Doug Setterberg
 Russ Conway
 Graham "Smacka" Fitzgibbon
 Ugly Dave Gray
 Stan Foster and His 1920's Impression
 Sammy Kaye and His Orchestra 
 Hanne Krogh
 Mike Mercado
 Benny Strong and His Orchestra

See also
 List of 1920s jazz standards

References

1920s jazz standards
1925 compositions
1925 songs
Dixieland jazz standards
American jazz songs
Songs about dancing
Songs with music by Ray Henderson
Songs with lyrics by Lew Brown
Songs with lyrics by Billy Rose

Frank Sinatra songs
Max Bygraves songs
Flappers